The Lambert River is a river of the West Coast Region of New Zealand's South Island.

See also
List of rivers of New Zealand

References

Rivers of the West Coast, New Zealand
Rivers of New Zealand
Westland District